Eternal is the forty-fourth album by Klaus Schulze. Taking in consideration the previously released multi-disc box sets (Silver Edition, Historic Edition, Jubilee Edition, Contemporary Works I, and Contemporary Works II), it could be viewed as Schulze's one hundred and fifth album. The album contains unreleased studio material recorded about a decade earlier, as well as reworked and previously released tracks.

Track listing

Disc 1

Disc 2

Personnel
 Klaus Schulze – electronics

External links
 Eternal at the official site of Klaus Schulze

References

Klaus Schulze albums
2017 albums